Pycnarmon annulalis is a moth in the family Crambidae. It was described by Paul Dognin in 1906. It is found in Peru.

References

Spilomelinae
Moths described in 1906
Moths of South America